The Cabinet of Jón Þorláksson was formed 8 July 1926.

Cabinet

Inaugural cabinet

See also 

1926 establishments in Iceland
1927 disestablishments in Iceland
Jon Thorlaksson, Cabinet of
Cabinets established in 1926
Cabinets disestablished in 1927